Radford is an inner-city area of Nottingham, located just outside the city centre. The appropriate ward of the City of Nottingham Council is called Radford and Park with a population of 21,414.

History

St Peter's Church, Radford was given by William Peveril to Lenton Priory. The church was rebuilt in 1812 at a cost of £2,000. The Wesleyan chapel was built in 1805 and enlarged in 1828. In September 1878 a chapel was built on St Peter's Street by the  United Methodist Free Churches at a cost of £1,900. It was closed owing to declining membership and income in June 1947 and purchased by the Evangelical Free Church.

Radford Registration District (RD) was created on 1 July 1837 on the introduction of Statutory Registration of Births, Marriages and Deaths (BMD) – and was abolished, and absorbed into Nottingham RD, on 1 July 1880.

Population by year
1811 – 5,704
1821 – 7,348
1831 – 16,568
1841 – 22,473
1851 – 12,635
1901 – 34,354

Background

The area has a large ethnic minority population (mainly European, West Indian, African, Arab, Asian, South American, Polish and increasingly Kurdish), and accordingly there is a large number of specialist food and retail shops catering to specific cultures, owing to the relatively cheap nature of housing in the area (and the large number of old Victorian properties converted into flats and bedsits). Crime rate is also very high.

Radford has a large student population, most of whom attend the nearby Nottingham Trent University and University of Nottingham.

Industry
Radford was the home of 
Raleigh Industries once the world's largest bicycle producer
Player's cigarettes, with a range of buildings housing factories, offices and warehouses
Manlove, Alliott & Co. Ltd. inventors of incinerators for waste disposal.

Culture
It provides the backdrop for much of Alan Sillitoe's book Saturday Night and Sunday Morning. Numerous scenes from the film of the book which starred Albert Finney were shot in Radford.

Bus services
Nottingham City Transport
 28: Nottingham → Radford (Ilkeston Road) → Jubilee Campus → Beechdale → Bilborough

 30: Nottingham → Radford (Ilkeston Road) → Jubilee Campus → Wollaton Park → Bramcote → Wollaton Vale

 31: Nottingham → Radford (Ilkeston Road) → Jubilee Campus (Grounds)

 77: Nottingham → Radford (Alfreton Road) → Aspley Lane → Strelley

 77C: Nottingham → Radford (Alfreton Road) → Aspley Lane → Strelley → Cinderhill

 78: Nottingham → Radford (Alfreton Road) → Nuthall Road → Broxtowe → Strelley

 79: Nottingham → Radford (Alfreton Road) → Nuthall Road → Cinderhill → Bulwell → Rise Park → Warren Hill → Bestwood Park → Arnold

 79A: Nottingham → Radford (Alfreton Road) → Nuthall Road → Cinderhill → Bulwell → Rise Park → Top Valley → Bestwood Park → Arnold

 79B: Nottingham → Radford (Alfreton Road) → Nuthall Road → Cinderhill → Bulwell / Rise Park

 N28: Nottingham → Radford (Ilkeston Road) → Jubilee Campus → Beechdale → Bilborough → Wollaton Vale

 N77: Nottingham → Radford (Alfreton Road) → Aspley Lane → Strelley → Cinderhill → Whitemoor

Trentbarton
 rainbow one: Nottingham → Radford (Alfreton Road) → Nuthall → Kimberley → Eastwood → Heanor / Ripley / Alfreton

 two: Nottingham → Radford (Ilkeston Road) → Wollaton → Trowell → Ilkeston → Cotmanhay

Nottingham Community Transport
 L4: Nottingham → Radford → Ainsley Estate → Beechdale → Aspley

 L7: Nottingham → Radford → Charlbury Road

 L12: QMC → Jubilee Campus → Radford → Hyson Green

 L14: Nottingham → Radford → Hyson Green → Bulwell

References

Areas of Nottingham
Former civil parishes in Nottinghamshire